The International Financing Review (abbreviated as IFR), also known as International Financing Review Magazine, is a London-based financial magazine and was established in 1974. It contains stories and data on international investment banking companies and international securities markets.

IFR, previously affiliated with Thomson Financial Limited, is now owned by Refinitiv, and the parent company of the magazine is London Stock Exchange Group.

References

1974 establishments in the United Kingdom
Business magazines published in the United Kingdom
London Stock Exchange
Magazines established in 1974
Magazines published in London